Jamesville is a hamlet made up of the outskirts of five towns: DeWitt, LaFayette, Manlius, Pompey and Onondaga.  Jamesville is located in Onondaga County, New York, United States, part of the greater Syracuse area.

History

The hamlet was named for early European-American settler James DeWitt. It was settled in the early Federal period after the American Revolutionary War, when the Iroquois tribes had been forced to cede their lands in New York to the United States.

The Dr. John Ives House, Saint Mark's Church, and Southwood Two-Teacher School are listed on the National Register of Historic Places.

2007 plant proposal
On January 16, 2007, a New York City company, Empire Synfuel LLC, submitted an application for site plan approval for a proposed coal gasification plant in Jamesville. It was to take over the site where the now abandoned Alpha Portland Cement factory once operated. The plant, projected to cost $1.3 billion and create up to 150 jobs, would have converted coal into synthetic natural gas.

The proposal faced opposition from area residents and town board members, who were concerned about such environmental issues as the proximity of the village's elementary school.

In addition, environmentalists opposed the plant because its releases of carbon dioxide would contribute to global warming.

According to the Sierra Club, the second proposal was also defeated.

Jamesville Reservoir

The Jamesville Reservoir is south of the hamlet. Jamesville Beach Park, a county park, includes a small beach on the reservoir, several hiking trails and fields. The fields are the site of the annual Jamesville BalloonFest, where dozens of hot-air balloons take to the air in one weekend. Both the reservoir and park are in the Town of LaFayette, New York, a larger jurisdiction that encompasses Jamesville.

Notable people
 Danny Cedrone, guitarist known for his work with Bill Haley & His Comets on "Rock Around the Clock"
 Danny Schayes, former professional basketball player in the NBA; son of Dolph Schayes

Further reading
The history of the community is documented in the book Water, Wheels and Stone: Heritage of the Little Village by the Creek, Jamesville, New York, written by Jean Schutz Keough, and published in 1976 and 1978 by the Jamesville Historical Book Committee.

References

External links
Jamesville Community Museum
Jamesville-DeWitt School District
 
  serving Jamesville and DeWitt

Hamlets in New York (state)
Syracuse metropolitan area
Hamlets in Onondaga County, New York